The dark-winged miner (Geositta saxicolina) is a species of bird in the family Furnariidae. It is endemic to Peru. Its natural habitat is subtropical or tropical high-altitude grassland.

References

Geositta
Endemic birds of Peru
Birds described in 1875
Taxa named by Władysław Taczanowski
Taxonomy articles created by Polbot